SteveIreneo! is an album by vocalist Irene Kral performing songs written by Steve Allen with Al Cohn's Orchestra which was recorded in 1959 and originally released on the United Artists label.

Track listing
All compositions by Steve Allen except where noted.
 "Too Late the Spring" (Alan Shulman, Steve Allen) – 2:21
 "Run (Don't Walk)" (Hank Jones, Allen) – 2:24
 "The Best Time of the Day" (Chubby Jackson, Allen) – 2:25
 "Yes" (Pete Rugolo, Herman Saunders, Lloyd Luhham, Allen) 2:29
 "There He Goes" – 2:47
 "And Even Then" – 3:03
 "Houseboat" (George Duning, Allen) – 3:00
 "Cool Blue" (Neal Hefti, Allen) – 2:00
 "What Is a Woman" – 2:28
 "Spring Is Where You Are" – 2:50
 "Impossible" – 2:56
 "Pleasant Dreams" – 2:45

Personnel 
Irene Kral – vocals
Al Cohn – arranger, conductor
Joe Newman – trumpet
Urbie Green – trombone
Eddie Caine – alto saxophone, flute
Zoot Sims – tenor saxophone
Danny Bank – baritone saxophone
Jimmy Raney – guitar
Hank Jones – piano
Chet Amsterdam – bass
Charlie Persip – drums
Joe Venuto – percussion

References 

1959 albums
Irene Kral albums
Steve Allen albums
United Artists Records albums
Albums arranged by Al Cohn
Vocal jazz albums